Snuff bottles were used during the Qing Dynasty to contain powdered tobacco. Smoking tobacco was illegal during the Qing Dynasty, but the use of snuff was allowed because the Chinese considered snuff to be a remedy for common illnesses such as colds, headaches and stomach disorders. Therefore, snuff was carried in a small bottle like other medicines. The snuff bottle replaced the snuff box used by Europeans.

History
Tobacco was introduced by the Portuguese to the court at Beijing some time during the mid- to late-16th century. It was originally smoked in pipes before the establishment of the Qing Dynasty. The use of snuff and snuff bottles spread through the upper class, and by the end of the 17th century it had become a part of social ritual to use snuff. This lasted through most of the 18th century. Eventually, the trend spread into the rest of the country and into every social class. It was common to offer a pinch of snuff as a way to greet friends and relatives. Snuff bottles soon became an object of beauty and a way to represent status and wealth.

The use of snuff increased and decreased with the rise and fall of the Qing Dynasty and died away soon after the establishment of the Republic of China. However, contemporary snuff bottles are still being made, and can be purchased in souvenir shops, flea markets and museum gift shops. Original snuff bottles from the Qing period are a desirable target for serious collectors and museums. A good bottle has an extra quality over and above its exquisite beauty and value: that is touch. Snuff bottles were made to be held and so, as a rule, they have a pleasant tactile quality.

Apart from the original snuff bottles, snuff bottles had expanded to a new genre of inside painting in the late Qing Dynasty. The inside painting was a skill that complied with traditional Chinese painting and the workmanship of original snuff bottles. Many western traders favoured this exquisite craft at that time and collected the majority of high-quality old snuff bottles. The works of four major inside painters such as Ma Shaoxuan and Ye Zhongsan's are appeared in the famous auctions.

So far, the inside painted snuff bottle is still being produced and regards as a work of art. Some master's work such as Wang Xisan are considered to be precious artwork instead of souvenir crafts.

Materials and sizes

The size of a snuff bottle is small enough to fit inside the palm. Snuff bottles were made out of many different materials including porcelain, jade, rhinoceros horn, ivory, wood, coconut shells, lapis lazuli, gneiss, cork, chalcedony, jasper, carnelian, malachite, quartz, tortoiseshell, metal, turquoise, agate, mother-of-pearl, and ceramic, though probably the most commonly used material was glass. The stopper usually had a very small spoon attached for extracting the snuff. Though rare, such bottles were also used by women in Europe in Victorian times, with the bottles typically made of cut glass.

Chinese snuff bottles were typically decorated with paintings or carvings, which distinguished bottles of different quality and value. Decorative bottles were, and remain, time-consuming in their production and are thus desirable for today's collectors.

Symbolism in snuff bottle decoration
 
Many bottles are completely devoid of decoration, others are incredibly ornate. As in all Chinese arts and crafts, motifs and symbols play an important part in decorative detail. Symbols are derived from a multitude of sources such as legends, history, religion, philosophy and superstition. The ideas used are almost always directed toward bringing wealth, health, good luck, longevity, even immortality to the owner of an artifact, frequently as a wish expressed in a kind of coded form by the giver of a gift. Probably the most popular decoration is the Shou character, a symbol of happiness and longevity, illustrated at right. Shou or Sau was one of Three Star Gods.

Another popular device is a representation of the 18 Lohan, who were the personal disciples of Buddha, just one group of the many revered immortals in China. Apart from the 18 Lohan there is a constellation of other divines who are portrayed, even their innards. The eight precious organs of the Buddha are venerated – his heart, gall bladder, spleen, lungs, liver, stomach, kidneys and intestines. These are rarely depicted on snuff bottles. Animals, on the other hand appear with regularity, the most common being the dragon.

 A dragon is shown in the example at right on a porcelain bottle in splendid red and blue and clutching the inevitable fiery pearl. One of the traditions of Chinese art is that only the Emperor, his sons and princes of the first and second ranks were permitted to own an artefact illustrated with a dragon having five claws. Four-clawed dragons were restricted to princes of the third and fourth ranks, while the common folk had to be content with a dragon having three claws. However, it is common to find that many older bottles have dragons with five claws.

 The horse is another animal frequently used in the decorative work. The horse is one of the Seven Treasures of Buddhism. Its symbolism points to speed, perseverance, rank, power and wealth. The symbolism of wealth and power came about because the horse carried those of importance. In the example at left, the horse seems to be carved in a very amateurish way, but in this school of bottle production, naïveté was the style.

The hare represents a wish for long life and even immortality. In Chinese tradition it is believed that if one attains a sufficiently high standard of morality and enlightenment, one will become one of the immortals.

Other commonly used symbols
The three legged toad is a mythical creature. It was thought to be an animated purse containing an inexhaustible supply of coins, hence it represents wealth and has become a symbol of the unattainable.

The fish is both an emblem of wealth and abundance and of harmony and connubial bliss. The fish emblem is used in a variety of decorative ways. Bamboo is a frequent motif. Because of its durability and its being evergreen it has come, along with many other symbols, to signify longevity.

"Inside painted" bottles

 Inside painted are glass bottles which have pictures and often calligraphy painted on the inside surface of the glass.

Their scenes are an inch or two high and are painted while manipulating the brush through the neck of the bottle at times only a quarter inch across, in reverse. Ursula Bourne, in her treatise on snuff, suggested that artisans painted on their backs to make it easier to work through the narrow opening. 
A skilled artist may complete a simple bottle in a week while something special may take a month or more to half a year and the best craftsmen will produce only a few bottles in a year.

Gan Xuanwen, also known as Gan Xuan has long been recognized as an important early artist of inside-painted snuff bottles in China. Quite a number of his bottles carry cyclical dates together with a reign period, and hence his works can be dated for certainty to roughly the first quarter of the 19th century, during the late Jiaqing (1796-1820) and early Daoguang (1821-1850) reigns of the Qing dynasty (1644-1911).

It was not until the early 19th century and late in the Jiaqing reign that snuff bottles decorated with inside painting came to the fore. The inspiration of inside-painted snuff bottles might have originated from the court, but did not receive any support of the imperial workshops. Nevertheless, this kind of snuff bottles quickly became the subject of acquisition for a new group of patrons, comprising officials, nobles, scholars and businessmen. Eventually the craft gained immense momentum in the late Qing and the early Republic periods, i.e. from the late 19th to the early 20th centuries. In Beijing, there were three renowned and influential masters, namely Zhou Leyuan, Ma Shaoxuan, Ding Erzhong and Ye Zhongsan. Inside painted bottles are still made extensively for collectors and becoming more valuable as work of art in the modern times.

Inside painted bottles themes include landscapes, bird-and-flowers, figures and auspicious themes. They are viewed as miniature paintings within the bottle.

Modern Era of Inside Painted Snuff Bottles 

After Qing Dynasty, few people take snuff. Snuff Bottle has been evolving into pure art instead of practical objects. A modern inside painted snuff bottle is one of a kind, which serves as a collectible item that captivates the art collectors.

Wang Xisan born in 1938, is commonly known as the most representative artist in the modern inside painted snuff bottle. There are four primary schools in this field: Ji, Lu, Jing, and Yue schools. Each school has its own characteristics on the snuff bottle's painting and even the carrier. For example, Yue school snuff bottle has a clear appearance that their snuff bottle is vase-shaped.

Of the schools, Ji school is the most significant painting style compared to three of others. In the peak time, Ji school has nearly 40,000 painters in Hengshui. By contrast, other schools' painters are more like a workshop, studio. The painters are not wide. Ji school was founded in 1966 by Wang Xisan. He greatly contributed to the development of Chinese modern inside painted snuff bottles. Many famous artists were learning under his teaching, such as Zhang Zenlou, Fu Guoshun, Li Yingtao. The modern snuff bottle has many advocates and is ongoing to be appear into eyes of oriental collectors.

The current market of inside painted snuff bottle 

By history Watershed, the inside painted snuff bottle can be divided into the old and the contemporary inside painting in the market. The old inside paintings include four great masters in the Qing Dynasty, Ma Shaoxuan, Ye Zhongsan, Ding Erzhong and Zhou Leyuan. The contemporary inner painting snuff bottles comprise the direct disciple headed by Master Wang Xisan, and well-known artists of the other three schools, such as Liu Shouben, Li Kechang, Wu Songling, etc., are all first-class masters who earned the title of Chinese arts and crafts issued by China authority. 

Snuff bottles made of other materials in the European and American markets is relatively high in value. Due to the historical nature, the old snuff bottle tends to against the devaluation. Western collectors have more recognition of the old ones. For example, the price of a work by Ma Shaoxuan's at Christie's Hong Kong auction in 2004 was sold in US$22,000 around. The work of Ding Erzhong in Sotheby's autumn auction in 2010 in New York was sold for US$170,500. By contrast, the marketability and value of contemporary interior-painted snuff bottles are still being verified. European and American collectors are also holding a wait-and-see attitude. The market is not yet transparent.

However, the Chinese arts and crafts masters of contemporary painters have begun to show significant growth. For example, in 2010, Zhang Guangqing's works were sold at the Beijing Hanhai auction for US$176,640 around; at the same auction. Wang Xisan's works were sold for US$178,230 around.

Modern interior-painted snuff bottles are still ongoing in a state of progress, just like conceptual art that is constantly evolving. In the future, contemporary interior-painted snuff bottles can genuinely develop their path and find the niches in the market.

Snuff bullet

In recent years a popular method of snuff insufflation has been the snuff bullet. A simple snuff bullet consists of a small bottle with a plug in the base, a rotatable "dosing chamber" and a hole on the top. More advanced snuff bullets have variable dosing settings. They can be made of plastic, glass or metal.

Notes

Further reading
The Collector's Book of Snuff Bottles by Bob C. Stevens
Chinese Snuff Bottles: The Adventures and Studies of a Collector by Lilla S. Perry
The Water, Pine and Stone Retreat Collection of Snuff Bottles

Chinese Snuff Bottles: Masterpieces in Miniature by Eric J. Hoffman
Wolfmar Zacken: 97 Chinesische Snuff Bottles aus China. Edition Galerie Zacke 1985

External links

 Weekly journals on Contemporary Inside Painted Snuff Bottle - Online Reference from D.D art
 Hugh Moss – Chinese Snuff Bottles – large gallery of designs and online reference material e-yaji.com
 International Chinese Snuff Bottle Society
 Collector's Book of Chinese Snuff Bottle: Introduction of All Kinds of Bottle
 CuiQiXuan - inside-painting snuff bottles
 Zhang Haihua Inner Painting Anthology 
 guyuexuan snuff bottle 
 International Chinese Snuff Bottle Association

Bottles
Chinese art
Chinese culture
Chinese inventions
Collecting
Containers
Fashion accessories
Tobacco accessories